"We Really Shouldn't Be Doing This" is a song written by Jim Lauderdale, and recorded by American country music artist George Strait.  It was released in September 1998 as the third and final single from his album One Step at a Time.  It peaked at number 4 in the United States, and number 2 in Canada.

Background and writing
Jim Lauderdale told Taste of Country that the song came to him when he was living in Nashville. He was living in Buddy and Julie Miller’s apartment above their house. They were working on an album, so in order to get some sleep, he went over to the Union Station hotel and found a good writing room."

Critical reception
Larry Flick, of Billboard magazine reviewed the song favorably, saying that the melody is "infectious and the production is positively inventive." He goes on to call it "fun, frisky, and totally entertaining."

Chart positions
"We Really Shouldn't Be Doing This" debuted at number 72 on the Hot Country Singles & Tracks chart dated May 2, 1998, from unsolicited airplay.

References

1998 singles
George Strait songs
Song recordings produced by Tony Brown (record producer)
Songs written by Jim Lauderdale
MCA Nashville Records singles
1998 songs